General elections were held in Grenada on 28 February 1972. The result was a victory for the Grenada United Labour Party, which won 13 of the 15 seats. Voter turnout was 83.5%.

Results

References

Elections in Grenada
1972 in Grenada
Grenada
February 1972 events in North America